Ried Scot Holien (born August 18, 1969) is the mayor Watertown, South Dakota an American politician and a Republican a former member of the South Dakota Senate representing District 5 from 2011 to 2017.

Education
Holien earned his bachelor's degree from Augustana College.

Elections
 2021 Holien defeated Mayor Sarah Caron to become the mayor of Watertown, South Dakota with 3,010 votes for Holien and 1,237 votes for Caron.
2012 Holien was unopposed for the June 5, 2012 Republican Primary and won the November 6, 2012 General election with 5,900 votes (60.54%) against Democratic nominee Jeff Dunn, who had run for the South Dakota House of Representatives in 2010.
2010 To challenge Senate District 5 incumbent Democratic Senator Nancy Turbak Berry, Holien was unopposed for the June 8, 2010 Republican Primary and won the November 2, 2010 General election with 4,642 votes (53.04%) against Senator Turbak Berry.

References

External links
Official page at the South Dakota Legislature
Campaign site

Ried Holien at Ballotpedia
Ried Holien at the National Institute on Money in State Politics

1969 births
Living people
Augustana University alumni
People from Watertown, South Dakota
Republican Party South Dakota state senators
21st-century American politicians